Somghan (also Romanized as Somghān and Samghān; also known as Samqān) is a village in Somghan Rural District, Chenar Shahijan District, Kazerun County, Fars Province, Iran. At the 2006 census, its population was 2,128, in 414 families.

References 

Populated places in Chenar Shahijan County